Wahau Kenyah is an Austronesian language of Kalimantan.

References

Languages of Indonesia
Kenyah languages